Mirandaphera maestratii is a species of sea snail, a marine gastropod mollusk in the family Cancellariidae, the nutmeg snails.

Description
The length of the shell attains 14 mm.

Distribution
This marine species occurs off New Caledonia.

References

Cancellariidae
Gastropods described in 2002